PAR Systems, Inc, is a systems engineering firm headquartered in Shoreview, Minnesota, specializing in automated manufacturing and material handling equipment. Subsidiaries include Jered LLC, specializing in marine equipment and cargo handling systems; Ederer LLC, specializing in custom and specialty cranes and associated equipment; CAMotion, specializing in advanced motion control and Cartesian palletizers  and Oak River Technology, specializing in automated manufacturing, testing equipment and medical device manufacturing equipment.  
PAR systems specializes in engineering equipment for the nuclear field, designing equipment for nuclear industry hot cells, process facilities and decommissioning applications in Japan, UK and United States. In the aerospace industry, PAR specializes in precision cutting, trimming, drilling, coating, scanning and non-destructive testing equipment  PAR Systems has quality certifications in ISO9001, AS9100, ISO13485 and ASME NQA-1 compliant.

History

PAR Systems was spun off from General Mills in 1961 under the name Programmed and Remote Systems Corporation.
in 2017, PAR Systems was acquired by the Minneapolis-based Pohlad family.

Contracts

Defense Contracts
Jered was the primary contractor for the aircraft elevators on the s, Tarawa-class, Wasp-class, and half of the Iwo Jima-class ships for the US navy, as well as the French aircraft carrier Charles de Gaulle and the Spanish aircraft carrier Príncipe de Asturias.

Main Crane system
PAR Systems was awarded the subcontract for the Main Crane System (MCS) for the Chernobyl New Safe Confinement. the system consists of two overhead bridge cranes, which support two 50-ton trolley hoists, and a Mobile Tool Platform (MTP). The MTP is suspended from a third trolley using a wire rope tensile truss with three paired winches, giving the platform six degrees of freedom. the MTP is equipped with a wide variety of tools, including a manipulator arm, that will be needed to dismantle the Sarcaphagus and reactor building so that the radioactive material can be moved to more stable containment. There are shielded garages along the track to allow tools to be exchanged to and from the bridges for maintenance and different operations.
Engineering was done by PAR Systems, and manufactured by PAR Systems and PAR Marine.

Products

PaR Systems has several standardized product lines, in addition to custom solutions.

CNC manufacturing
PAR Systems' line of 5-axis waterjet cutters is sold under the Vector brand. they can be used to cut from three-dimensional objects.

Palletizing and packaging

Hazardous environment

See also

 List of Minnesota companies

References

External links

Engineering companies of the United States
Manufacturing companies based in Minnesota
Nuclear technology companies of the United States